Ledgard Bridge crosses the River Calder in Mirfield, West Yorkshire, England. It was built in 1800 as a replacement for an earlier bridge in the same location and is a Grade II listed structure.

History
The first bridge to cross the River Calder in Mirfield was a wooden structure built in 1303. This was replaced many times, one earlier stone bridge being named as Ledger Bridge on a 1773 map of the West Riding of Yorkshire. The 1800 bridge survived the great flood of 20 September 1946 which caused much damage along the whole valley.

See also
List of crossings of the River Calder

References

Bridges over the River Calder
Bridges completed in 1800
Bridges in West Yorkshire
Grade II listed bridges
Grade II listed buildings in West Yorkshire